Tungari is a genus of Australian brushed trapdoor spiders first described by Robert Raven in 1994.

Species
 it contains four species:
Tungari aurukun Raven, 1994 – Australia (Queensland)
Tungari kenwayae Raven, 1994 (type) – Australia (Queensland)
Tungari mascordi Raven, 1994 – Australia (Queensland)
Tungari monteithi Raven, 1994 – Australia (Queensland)

References

Barychelidae
Mygalomorphae genera
Spiders of Australia